Henry Rudge Hayward (1831-1912) was Archdeacon of Cheltenham from 1883 to 1908.

Education
Hayward  was educated at John Roysse's Free School in Abingdon-on-Thames (now Abingdon School) which he attended as a boarder from August 1840 until 1849; and Pembroke College, Oxford, matriculating in 1849 and graduating B.A. 1853, M.A. 1856. He was a scholar from 1849 to 1858 and a fellow from 1858 to 1864. He was ordained in 1855.

Career
After a curacy in Marlow, he held incumbencies in Fawley, Lydiard Millicent from 1864 to 1881 and Cirencester from 1881 to 1898. He was a Residentiary Canon at Gloucester Cathedral from 1898 to his death.

See also

 List of Old Abingdonians

References

1831 births
1912 deaths
People educated at Abingdon School
Alumni of Pembroke College, Oxford
Archdeacons of Cheltenham